Mikel Irujo Amezaga (born 6 October 1972) is a Navarrese politician, Minister of Economic and Business Development of Navarre since February 2021.

References

1972 births
Government ministers of Navarre
Geroa Bai politicians
Living people
Politicians from Navarre